Deutsche Kreditbank (DKB) is the second-largest direct bank in Germany with 4.5 million customers, fully owned by Bayerische Landesbank. In 2018 the company, with its parent company BayernLB, ranked 7th on the list of the biggest banks in Germany.

The bank is located in Berlin and its infrastructure consists of a small number of branches. The focus on a selected group of customers including retail clients, business clients, and public clients are part of the bank's corporate.

History

Deutsche Kreditbank was founded on March 19, 1990 as the first private bank in East Germany, and was set up as a stock corporation. One of the founders was Edgar Most, the last vice president of the Staatsbank (State Bank of the GDR). The share capital was held by the Staatsbank of the GDR, the Verband deutscher Konsumgenossenschaften, the Interhotels, the nationally owned Centrum Warenhaus, and VEB Synthesewerk Schwarzheide. On 1 April 1990, the bank began operations in the GDR with an opening balance of 286.5 billion East German marks. From the onset, Deutsche Kreditbank covered a broad spectrum of services, from business to retail customers. In its closing balance on 30 June 1990, the bank's own funds amounted to 11 billion East German marks.

On June 21, 1990 the debits of the Staatsbank were endorsed on DKB, and DKB's shares that were owned by the Staatsbank were transferred to the Treuhandanstalt. In the following years, the Treuhandanstalt bought the remaining shares from the founding shareholders until the beginning of 1993, when it became the sole owner of the DKB.

The majority of the deposit-taking business (especially corporate and retail banking), as well as a number of branch buildings and locations, were taken over by Dresdner Bank and by Deutsche Bank in the course of the currency union, and ran under Dresdner Bank Kreditbank AG and Deutsche Bank Kreditbank AG until 1991. According to the report of the Bundesrechnungshof (Federal Audit Office), the buyers received access to the branches, the customer base, and buildings of the GDR banks for preferential prices. Deutsche Bank subsequently took possession of shares of DKB including 112 branch offices for 310 million marks. A subsidiary of Dresdner Bank paid 87,3 million Deutsche marks for 41 properties, including buildings that were formerly owned by DKB. A subsidiary of Deutsche Bank bought 74 properties for 164,4 million Deutsche marks. The auditors of the Bundesrechnungshof considered these "unreasonable low purchase prices".

When the Treuhandanstalt was closed on December 31, 1994, DKB was briefly owned by the Federal Ministry of Finance until the bank was sold to BayernLB on January 31, 1995.

Corporate structure

The bank runs 26 branch offices throughout Germany. The property subsidiary DKB Grund Gmbh is based in 15 of these locations.

On January 1, 2008 DKB took over the Miles & More-Credit Card which was previously issued by BayernLB in cooperation with Lufthansa.

At the end of March 2012 DKB Immobilien AG was sold to TAG Immobilien AG.

Since June 14, 2015 SKG Bank has no longer been an independent stock company, but a branch and brand of DKB.

Issuer
DKB regularly issues its own stocks on the capital market. In 2016 the volume of the shares on the market amounted to 10 billion Euro. The rating agency Moody's Corporation rated DKB's bonds Aaa, and its naked bonds A2. In 2016 DKB issued its first so-called Green Bond with a volume of 500 million Euro. This bond was positively rated by the sustainability rating agency oekom research (Second Party Opinion). In addition, the DKB Green Bond received a certification label from the Climate Bond Initiative (CBI).

Service
The bank's best-known product is the Girokonto (account) DKB Cash. Other products and services on offer are private real estate financing, brokerage services, installment credits, and savings products.

The bank only runs a small number of ATMs but offers its customers free use of other ATMs. Since June 2016 the bank has charged fees for using ATMs in countries outside of the EU.

Since June 2014 DKB has collaborated with PayPal and offers its customers access to all their PayPal transactions via the DKB online banking portal.

DKB's focus is on the digitalization of banking. Since 2013 the bank has worked on this goal with respective service companies and fintechs such as Berlin-based FinReach for account changing services, Cringle for P2P-transactions via its smartphone app, and WebID Solutions for video identification procedures. The technology underlying the DKB banking app, with which customers can photograph, submit, and pay their bills, was designed by Gini.

Since December 8, 2014 DKB has offered existing clients pushTAN and chipTAN, two alternative options to the iTan procedure.

Financial figures

Since 2005 DKB has provided consolidated financial statements. Since 2006 the International Financial Reporting Standards have been applied to the bank's billing processes.

Board of directors
The board of directors is currently made up of 16 shareholders and employee representatives:

Shareholder representatives
 Stephan Winkelmeier (chairman)
 Bernd Fröhlich
 Stefan Höck
 Michael Huber
 Marcus Kramer
 Ulrich Netzer
 Markus Wiegelmann
 Edgar Zoller

Employee representatives
 Bianca Häsen (vice chairman)
 Michaela Bergholz (labor union representative)
 Carsten Birkholz
 Christine Enz (labor union representative)
 Jörg Feyerabend
 Jens Hübler
 Maria Miranov
 Frank Radtke

Personalities
These persons have previously had a mandate in the bank:

 Gerhard Gribkowsky, board of directors from April 3, 2007 until April 10, 2008
 Michael Kemmer, chairman of board of directors from March 1, 2008 until December 14, 2009, before member from April 3, 2007
 Siegfried Naser, board of directors from March 9, 2007 until June 30, 2009
 Franz Josef Pschierer, board of directors from February 24, 2009 until March 24, 2009
 Werner Schmidt, chairman of board of directors from March 8, 2006 until March 1, 2008, before vice chairman
 Günther Troppmann, chairman of board of directors from March 1, 1996 until December 31, 2012, before (since March 1, 1995) full member of board of directors

Sponsoring

To focus on its socially impactful activities, DKB founded DKB Foundation for Social Engagement (DKB Stiftung für gesellschaftliches Engagement) in October 2004. The foundation runs heritage-protected sites such as Schloss Liebenberg. Since 2002 the bank has supported German top athletes, sports clubs, and leagues. Athletes from the local winter sports and athletic sports club come together to form the DKB team. In Berlin the bank is a sponsoring partner of the sports teams Hertha BSC, Alba Berlin, Eisbären Berlin, Füchse Berlin, and Berlin Recycling Volleys. 

Since 2007 the bank has had naming rights for the Oberhofer biathlon stadium, the DKB-Ski-Arena. Until 2009 DKB was the main sponsor for ISTAF Berlin (athletics) and name sponsor for DKB-Riders Tour (show jumping). Since the 2012/2013 season DKB has been the naming sponsor of the Handball-Bundesliga and the 1. FFC Turbine Potsdam women's football club.

In 2017 the bank bought the exclusive live broadcasting rights of the 2017 World Men's Handball Championship for Germany after various negotiations by internet providers and TV channels with the rights owner beIN Media Group failed. The championship matches of the Germany men's national handball team were broadcast live via internet. It was the first time in Germany that a major sports event was broadcast by a single sponsor. Over the duration of the event, over 6 million visits to the website were recorded.

Reporting 
Since 2016, DKB has reported its annual sustainability activities according to the "Deutschen Nachhaltigkeitskodex (DNK)" guidelines.

References

External links 

 Official Website

Banks of Germany
Online banks